Kristin Danielsen (born 1972) is a Norwegian dancer, choreographer and cultural administrator.

She was born in Arendal. She was trained as dancer at Den norske balletthøgskole in Oslo and the Broadway Dance Centre in New York City, and graduated as Master of Arts Management from the City, University of London. After a career as dancer and choreographer, she assumed various administrative positions. She further held administrative positions at Ny Musikk (2006–2010), Det Norske Teatret (2010–2011), MIC Norsk musikkinformasjon (2011–2013), and Oslo Public Library (2014–2016). She was appointed Director of the Arts Council Norway in 2016.

References

1972 births
Living people
People from Arendal
Norwegian female dancers
Norwegian choreographers
Norwegian expatriates in England
Norwegian expatriates in the United States
Directors of government agencies of Norway
Sportspeople from Agder